The 2022 BBVA Open Internacional de Valencia was a professional women's tennis tournament played on outdoor clay courts. It was the second edition of the tournament and first ever as a WTA 125 event which is also part of the 2022 WTA 125 tournaments season. It took place in Valencia, Spain between 6 and 12 June 2022.

Singles main-draw entrants

Seeds

 1 Rankings are as of 23 May 2022.

Other entrants
The following players received wildcards into the singles main draw:
  Aliona Bolsova
  Irene Burillo Escorihuela
  Ángela Fita Boluda
  Solana Sierra

The following players received entry from the qualifying draw:
  Seone Mendez
  Carole Monnet
  Leyre Romero Gormaz
  Katarina Zavatska

The following player received entry as a lucky loser:
  Elsa Jacquemot

Withdrawals 
Before the tournament
  Irina-Camelia Begu → replaced by  Olga Danilović
  Marta Kostyuk → replaced by  Mirjam Björklund
  Aleksandra Krunić → replaced by  Elsa Jacquemot
  Rebecca Peterson → replaced by  Réka Luca Jani
  Nadia Podoroska → replaced by  Renata Zarazúa
  Anna Karolína Schmiedlová → replaced by  Sara Errani
  Mayar Sherif → replaced by  Julia Grabher
  Martina Trevisan → replaced by  Rebeka Masarova

Doubles entrants

Seeds 

 1 Rankings as of 23 May 2022.

Champions

Singles

  Zheng Qinwen def.  Wang Xiyu 6–4, 4–6, 6–3

Doubles

  Aliona Bolsova /  Rebeka Masarova def.  Alexandra Panova /  Arantxa Rus 6–0, 6–3

References

External links
 Official website

2022 WTA 125 tournaments
2022 in Spanish tennis
June 2022 sports events in Spain